Saori Sugimoto (17 November 1964 – 21 October 2021) was a Japanese voice actress who known for voicing Ramurin Makiba and Nikki in the Anime TV show Shimajiro and in the Shimajiro films, She also voiced Kisanta Yamamura in the Nintama Rantaro anime, taking over the role from Tomiko Suzuki. In Mobile Suit Gundam Wing, she voiced the character Catherine Bloom.

Death
On 21 October 2021, Saori Sugimoto died due to congestive heart failure associated with anorexia. She was 58. Her family held a private funeral.

Filmography

Television
 Armor Hunter Mellowlink (OAV) as Dancing Girl B (episode 6)
 Bikkuri-Man as Chakkun Cutter; Joshi Suisai
 The Brave Fighter of Sun Fighbird
 Chibi Maruko-chan as Ruriko; Toshiko-chan; Yurie Hayashi
 Chibi Maruko-chan as Toshiko Tsuchihashi (ep 265)
 City Hunter 2 as Child (episode 46); Girl A (episode 33); Girl B (episode 37); Hostess B (ep 43); Little Girl (episode 30); Nurse B (episode 20); Woman (episode 22, 29); Woman A (episode 24–25, 31)
 Daddy Long-Legs; Female student A (episode 6); Girl (episode 1); Operator (episode 22)
 Fist of the North Star 2 as Asuka (episode 8, 11–13); Tetsu (episode 33)
 Fortune Quest L as Cathy (episode 23)
 Funky Fables as Girl (Christmas Carol)
 Galaxy Fraulein Yuna Returns (OAV) as Malina
 Genki Bakuhatsu Ganbaruger as School announcement (episode 29); School Announcer
 Green Green (OAV) as Sanae Minami
 Green Green as Sanae Minami
 Green Green Character DVD (OAV) as Sanae Minami
 Green Green Thirteen: Erolutions (OAV) as Sanae Minami
 Hakken Taiken Daisuki! Shimajirō as Ramurin Makiba
 Hello! Lady Lin as Female Student; Nancy
 Kamen no Ninja Akakage as O-Kiku
 Kariage-kun as Kimura Takashi
 Kiteretsu Daihyakka as Fuyumi; Kayo; Masako; Reiko
 Lomien Man
 Madonna (OAV) as High School Girl (episode 1)
 Mobile Suit Gundam Wing (TV) as Catherine Bloom
 Mobile Suit Gundam Wing: Endless Waltz (OAV) as Caroline Bloom
 Mobile Suit Gundam Wing: Operation Meteor (OAV) as Catherine Bloom
 Mock & Sweet as butterfly (episode 34); Kiki's mother (episode 41); villager (episode 43); weasel child (episode 36)
 Ninja Ryūkenden (OAV) as Katherine Friedman
 Orphen as Ruru
 Romeo and the Black Brothers as Nana
 Sakigake!! Otoko Juku
 Sans Famille as Jeanne (episode 19)
 Sazae-san
 Shimajiro (1993–2021) Ramurin Makiba, Nyakkii Momoyama
 Shin Bikkuriman as 1-2 Sansuke; Besutaniya ; Carnivon; Chakkun Cutter; Joshi Suisai; Kaanibon ; Meidon Reishi; Vestanya
 Shin chan as Kutsuzoko Atsumi (episode 400)
 Shōnan Bakusōzoku (OAV) as Girl 2 (episode 4)
 Sonic X as Boom 1 (episode 19)
 Super Mario no Shōbōtai (OAV) as Kaoru
 Takoyaki Mant-Man as Princess
 Three Little Ghosts as baby (episode 1–2); Sansan (episode 17)
 Trapp Ikka Monogatari as Girl (episode 2); Martina
 The Chronicles of Narnia as Jill Pole (BBC Serial Drama dub) (Japanese Dub)

Film
 Bikkuriman: Taiichiji Seima Taisen as Baby
 Mobile Suit Gundam Wing: Endless Waltz Special Edition (movie) as Caroline Bloom
 Sangokushi [2] Chōkō Moyu!
 Shimajiro and Fufu's Big Adventure 2013 Nyakkii Momoyama
 Shimajiro and the Whale's Song 2014 Nyakkii Momoyama
 Shimajiro and the Mother Tree 2015 Nyakkii Momoyama
 Shimajiro in Bookland 2016 Nyakkii Momoyama
 Shimajiro and the Rainbow Oasis 2017 Nyakkii Momoyama
 Shimajiro the Movie: Adventures on Magic Island 2018 Nyakkii Momoyama, Ramurin
 Shimajiro and Ururu's Hero Island 2019 Nyakkii Momoyama
 Shimajiro to Sora Tobufune 2021 Nyakkii Momoyama
 Shin Maple Town Monogatari - Home Town Hen
 Shimajirō to Kirakira Ōkoku no Ōji-sama 2022 Nyakkii Momoyama (Posthumous release)

Video games
 Kunio no Oden as Hasebe, Momozono

References

1964 births
2021 deaths
Japanese video game actresses
Japanese voice actresses
20th-century Japanese actresses
21st-century Japanese actresses